Erik van der Ven (born 15 February 1984) is a Dutch professional football manager and former player who is the manager of Eerste Divisie side FC Den Bosch. As a player, he played as a midfielder for KRC Genk, Helmond Sport, TOP Oss, FC Emmen and De Treffers. He was appointed as manager of FC Den Bosch on a temporary basis in May 2019, having previously been assistant manager, before becoming the manager on a permanent basis in June 2019. He left the club in January 2021 by mutual consent.

References

1984 births
Living people
Dutch footballers
Dutch football managers
People from Landerd
Footballers from North Brabant
Association football midfielders
K.R.C. Genk players
Helmond Sport players
TOP Oss players
FC Emmen players
De Treffers players
Eerste Divisie players
Derde Divisie players
Belgian Pro League players
FC Den Bosch managers
Eerste Divisie managers
Dutch expatriate footballers
Expatriate footballers in Belgium
Dutch expatriate sportspeople in Belgium